Evil Con Carne is an American animated television series created by Maxwell Atoms for Cartoon Network. The series centers on wealthy crime lord Hector Con Carne, who is reduced to his brain and stomach after an assassination attempt and subsequently implanted onto Boskov, a purple circus bear. Aided by scientist Major Dr. Ghastly and military leader General Skarr, Hector now oversees criminal organization Evil Con Carne, continuing his quest for world domination.

The series first appeared on Cartoon Network during the show Grim & Evil, along with sister series The Grim Adventures of Billy & Mandy. Thirteen more half-hour episodes of Grim & Evil were produced in 2003 and 2004; the two series became separate programs later that year. While The Grim Adventures of Billy & Mandy went on to run for six seasons, Evil Con Carne only ran for thirteen full episodes (22 airings) and ended on October 22, 2004. After the show's end, its characters would frequently make cameo appearances in Billy & Mandy, with General Skarr becoming a recurring character. An official series finale, titled "Company Halt" (which was also a crossover with Billy & Mandy), aired on March 16, 2007.

Premise 

Hector Con Carne (Phil LaMarr), a wealthy crime lord and evil genius bent on taking over the world and the League of Nations, was caught in an explosion initiated by his nemesis, Cod Commando (Maxwell Atoms), a soldier for the Secret Paramilitary Organized Response Kommand (S.P.O.R.K.). The explosion scattered most of his body across the world. He was rescued by the scientist Major Dr. Ghastly (Grey DeLisle), who placed his living remains into two containment units: one for his brain, and the other for his stomach. These two units were later installed into Boskov (Frank Welker), a purple Russian circus bear, giving Con Carne's brain control over (almost) all the bear's actions and movements.

Hector, Dr. Ghastly and his military leader, General Skarr (Armin Shimerman), then created a secret laboratory on an island with a bunny-shaped mountain known as "Bunny Island" (a parody of Ernst Stavro Blofeld's lair in the James Bond movies). Gathering an army, Con Carne resumed his quest for world domination and made a new goal: to find his missing body parts. The group's schemes typically end in failure, often due to the behavior and conflicts within the trio: Skarr is tired of being directed by Hector and wishes to overthrow him; Ghastly cares more about her unrequited love for her boss than world domination; while Hector is narcissistic, megalomaniacal, and generally abusive towards his henchmen.

Voice cast

Main 
 Phil LaMarr as Hector Con Carne
 Grey DeLisle as Major Dr. Ghastly
 Armin Shimerman as General Skarr, Hector's Stomach
 Frank Welker as Boskov the Bear

Recurring voices 
 Maxwell Atoms as Cod Commando
 Maurice LaMarche as Estroy
 Peter Renaday as Abraham Lincoln
 Rino Romano as Destructicus Con Carne

Production 
A viewer's poll to decide a new Cartoon Network animated series, titled Big Pick, was held on the internet from June 16 to August 25, 2000. The three choices for short films to become animated series were The Grim Adventures of Billy & Mandy, Whatever Happened to... Robot Jones?, and Longhair and Doubledome. After the event, the Meet the Reaper short film won with 57% of the vote. While Whatever Happened to... Robot Jones? became an animated series in 2002, Longhair and Doubledome appeared at another Big Pick event, but lost once again. Another original short/pilot titled Evil Con Carne had been produced in 2000, shortly after the Billy & Mandy short. The two ideas were ultimately combined into a single show, as Cartoon Network desired a show that had a "middle cartoon" as an in-between segment (a format found in the Dial M For Monkey and The Justice Friends shorts in Dexter's Laboratory, and the I Am Weasel segment on Cow and Chicken).

The resulting show, Grim & Evil, premiered on August 24, 2001, and was put on hiatus on October 18, 2002. In 2003, 13 more half-hour episodes of Grim & Evil were made, but aired when Cartoon Network separated the two series, and The Grim Adventures of Billy and Mandy and Evil Con Carne earned their own full-length series later that year. After production wrapped on both series' new seasons, the network gave Maxwell Atoms a decision to choose one show to continue, while the other would be dropped from production. Atoms ultimately went with Billy & Mandy, and the final season of Evil Con Carne subsequently aired in 2004. He embraced the network's decision to drop one of the two series, as he considered being in charge of producing both shows difficult.

After Evil Con Carne was cancelled, its characters appeared in The Grim Adventures of Billy & Mandy. The first cameo was in the episode "Chicken Ball Z" which ended with Mandy purchasing Hector's Bunny Island. General Skarr moved to Billy's neighborhood in the episode "Skarred for Life" after Bunny Island was bought out by an "entertainment corporation that didn't want competition in world domination". Since then, General Skarr went on to become a recurring character in Billy & Mandy. In the episode "Company Halt", Con Carne and Ghastly appear in Endsville, in order to recruit Skarr and revive Evil Con Carne (the organization, not the show) in another attempt to take over the world; naturally, like most of their other schemes and misadventures, it ends in failure when Skarr turns against Hector once he tries to destroy his garden in an attempt to kill Billy, and crushes him with a giant catapult (which they were to use to destroy the neighborhood), causing Ghastly and the rest of the army run away. According to Tom Warburton, characters from Evil Con Carne were originally set to appear in the television special "The Grim Adventures of the KND". Hector, General Skarr, and Dr. Ghastly (strangely, they're "costumed" by Lazlo, Raj, and Clam) did briefly appear in the crossover's end credits in a crossover with Camp Lazlo titled "Evil Camp Carne".

On July 29, 2016, the series aired re-runs for a single day on Cartoon Network's sister channel, Boomerang, in the United States, despite the schedule for Boomerang saying that The Grim Adventures of Billy & Mandy was airing in its timeslot.

Censorship 
When the show was running as a segment on Grim & Evil, the two part episode "The Smell of Vengeance" was subject to censorship in the wake of the September 11 attacks. The episode centered on Hector and his army using an oversized stink gun on New York City, unleashing a stench that sends its citizens into a frenzy. A particular scene featured people jumping off of the World Trade Center prompted the decision. "There are the twin towers, and you see tiny, little people hopping off the roof of the towers into the water", said Linda Simensky, then senior vice president of animation for Cartoon Network. "I mean, two weeks ago, you wouldn't have thought about it. What were the chances of anyone jumping out of the World Trade Center?" In response, Atoms reworked the episode, so it took place in rural Kansas instead; despite these changes, the episode was still suspended from broadcast rotation.

Episodes
Note: Most of the episodes did not air in production code order.

Season 1a (2001–02)

Season 1b (2003–04)

Season 2 (2004)

Crossover episode (2007)

Home media 
Five episodes are included as bonus features in the Season 1 DVD set for The Grim Adventures of Billy & Mandy. On August 16, 2018, the entire series was added to the iTunes Store under a single volume.

See also 
 The Grim Adventures of Billy & Mandy
 Grim & Evil

References

External links

  (archive)
 
 

2000s American animated television series
2000s American comic science fiction television series
2001 American television series debuts
2004 American television series endings
American animated television spin-offs
American children's animated comic science fiction television series
Alternate history television series
Brain transplantation in fiction
Television series by Cartoon Network Studios
English-language television shows
Fictional depictions of Abraham Lincoln in television
Military science fiction television series
Animated television series about bears
The Grim Adventures of Billy & Mandy
Spanish-language television shows
Supervillain television shows
Television series created by Maxwell Atoms
Television series set in 2002
Television shows set in the United States
Cartoon Cartoons